Everton Santos da Costa or simply Everton Costa (born January 6, 1986, in Ponta Grossa), is a Brazilian striker.

Honours
Grêmio
Rio Grande do Sul State League: 2007

Internacional
Libertadores Cup: 2010

Coritiba
Paraná State League: 2012

References

External links
 CBF

1986 births
Living people
Brazilian footballers
Adap Galo Maringá Football Club players
Grêmio Foot-Ball Porto Alegrense players
Paulista Futebol Clube players
Fredrikstad FK players
Sociedade Esportiva e Recreativa Caxias do Sul players
Sport Club Internacional players
Coritiba Foot Ball Club players
Santos FC players
CR Vasco da Gama players
Brazilian expatriate footballers
Expatriate footballers in Norway
Brazilian expatriate sportspeople in Norway
Campeonato Brasileiro Série A players
Campeonato Brasileiro Série B players
Eliteserien players
People from Ponta Grossa
Association football forwards
Sportspeople from Paraná (state)